Françoise Isabella Agazarian (née Andre; 8 May 1913 – 24 June 1998), known as Francine Agazarian, was a World War II spy working with the Special Operations Executive (SOE).

SOE Work
Francine Agazarian landed in France by Lysander aircraft on 17 March 1943, along with Claude de Baissac and France Antelme.  She was joining her husband Jack Agazarian and the Prosper as a courier.  It was deemed unusual a married couple working on the same network; after the war Francine clarified the situation:

Although in the same network, my husband and I were not working together; as a radio operator he worked alone and transmitted from different locations every day. I was only responsible to Prosper (Francis Suttill) whom we all called Francois. He liked to use me for special errands because, France being my native land, I could get away from difficulties easily enough, particularly when dealing with officialdom.

Francois was an outstanding leader, clear-headed, precise, confident. I liked working on his instructions, and I enjoyed the small challenges he was placing in front of me. For instance calling at town halls in various districts of Paris to exchange the network's expired ration cards (manufactured in London) for genuine new ones. Mainly I was delivering his messages to his helpers: in Paris, in villages, or isolated houses in the countryside. From time to time I was also delivering demolition material received from England. And once, with hand-grenades in my shopping bag, I travelled in a train so full that I had to stand against a German NCO. This odd situation was not new to me. I had already experienced it for the first time on the day of my arrival on French soil, when I had to travel by train from Poitiers to Paris. A very full train also. I sat on my small suitcase in the corridor, a uniformed German standing close against me. But, that first time, tied to my waist, under my clothes, was a wide black cloth belt containing bank-notes for Prosper, a number of blank identity cards and a number of ration cards; while tucked into the sleeves of my coat were crystals for Prosper's radio transmitters; the crystals had been skilfully secured to my sleeves by Vera Atkins herself, before my departure from Orchard Court. My .32 revolver and ammunition were in my suitcase. The ludicrousness of the situation somehow eliminated any thoughts of danger.

In any case, I believe none of us in the field ever gave one thought to danger. Germans were everywhere, especially in Paris; one absorbed the sight of them and went on with the job of living as ordinarily as possible and applying oneself to one's work.

Because I worked alone, the times I liked best were when we could be together, Prosper (Francis Suttill), Denise (Andrée Borrel), Archambaud (Gilbert Norman), Marcel (Jack Agazarian) and I, sitting round a table, while I was decoding radio messages from London; we were always hoping to read the exciting warning to stand by, which would have meant that the liberating invasion from England was imminent.

As the network appeared to be close to being broken by the Germans, Francine and Jack returned to England by Lysander on 16 June 1943; arriving on that flight were Diana Rowden, Cecily Lefort and Noor Inayat Khan. Of the five, only Francine would survive the war. Jack returned to France, but was arrested on 30 July 1943 after falling for a German trap. He was tortured by the Gestapo for six months at Fresnes Prison and eventually sent to the Flossenbürg concentration camp where he was kept in solitary confinement and executed on 29 March 1945.

Post war
After the war, Francine Agazarian settled in London.

Awards
Francine Agazarian was Mentioned in Dispatches for her actions in France; her husband was also Mentioned in Dispatches and was posthumously awarded the Légion d'honneur and Croix de Guerre.

References

French Resistance members
People from Narbonne
Place of death missing
1913 births
1998 deaths
French Special Operations Executive personnel